Eric Bays is a retired Anglican bishop.

Born on 10 August 1932  and educated at the University of Manitoba and the University of Saskatchewan, he was ordained in 1959. After a curacy at All Saints’, Winnipeg he was Priest in charge at Burns Lake, and then Masset, British Columbia. Later he was Vicar of St Saviour’s, Winnipeg and then Rector of All Saints', Winnipeg and Canon of St. John's Cathedral in the same city. From 1976 he was a professor at the College of Emmanuel and St Chad, and later Vice-Principal.  In 1986 he was elected Bishop of Qu'Appelle, a post he held for 11 years.

Notes

1932 births
Living people
University of Manitoba alumni
Academic staff of the University of Saskatchewan
20th-century Anglican Church of Canada bishops
Anglican bishops of Qu'Appelle